Taskin (also Romanized as Taskīn) is a village in Dastjerd Rural District, Alamut-e Gharbi District, Qazvin County, Qazvin Province, Iran. At the 2006 census, its population was 31, in 9 families.

References 

Populated places in Qazvin County